State Road 64 in the U.S. State of Indiana is an east–west highway that crosses most of the southern portion of the state, covering a distance of about .

It is often referred to as Indiana 64 to distinguish it from the Interstate.

Route description
State Road 64 begins at a bridge across the Wabash River at Mount Carmel, Illinois, connecting it with Illinois Route 15. It ends at Interstate 64 near Edwardsville. Most of the route is two-lane undivided highway, with undivided multi-lane segments in the city of Princeton around the junction of U.S. Route 41, and through the city of Huntingburg as well as near English.

Traffic Congestion
Traffic conditions on the stretch between Princeton and Mount Carmel are notorious for often being congested with large number of coal trucks between local mines and Gibson Generating Station, located near the route's western terminus and Illinois resident employees of both the plant and Toyota Motor Manufacturing Indiana and suppliers in Princeton using the same two lane road in their commute combined with  decreases in local grocery stores resulting in more senior citizens on the main roads often result in severe traffic congestion during two distinct periods in the day. Due to the coal truck traffic from Gibson County Coal's new mine near Owensville, the Indiana 64-65 CR 650 Intersection, located halfway between Princeton and Mount Carmel,  received a long awaited  upgrade from flashing lights to a full traffic light intersection in December 2014, allowing a more orderly traffic flow and reducing the amount of fatal crashes at the junction. 2 people were killed at this intersection in 2017. In addition, others have been killed in 2016 and 2017. The Gibson County Sheriff department and Indiana State Police seldom patrol this stretch of deadly highway. A new coal loading facility is being built adjacent to this stretch of highway which has already increased the number of accidents prior to the opening of the facility. Despite INDOT continuing to insist there is no need, many commuters in both Indiana and Illinois have been pushing for widening it to 4 lanes, in part or in whole from Princeton to Mount Carmel.

Until late 2010, at the western end of the highway were two very narrow bridges that typically handled at least 900-1,200 vehicles a day, doubling to ~2,000 a day vehicles during Mount Carmel's Ag Days, Lone Ranger Festival, and other holidays. Excavation began on a parallel replacement bridge in April 2008, and the new bridge was opened (with the highway realigned appropriately) in December 2010.

Major intersections

References 

064
Transportation in Crawford County, Indiana
Transportation in Dubois County, Indiana
Transportation in Floyd County, Indiana
Transportation in Gibson County, Indiana
Transportation in Harrison County, Indiana
Transportation in Pike County, Indiana